102 may refer to:
102 (number), the number
AD 102, a year in the 2nd century AD
102 BC, a year in the 2nd century BC
102 (ambulance service), an emergency medical transport service in Uttar Pradesh, India
102 (Clyde) Field Squadron, Royal Engineers

10/2 may refer to:
 10//2, a Nike clothing line inspired by Lance Armstrong
 October 2 (month-day date notation)
 February 10 (day-month date notation)
 10 shillings and 2 pence in UK predecimal currency

See also
 1/2 (disambiguation), for uses of "1/02"
 Nobelium, chemical element with atomic number 102